Chirk Community Hospital is a community hospital in Chirk, Wales. It is managed by the Betsi Cadwaladr University Health Board.

History
The hospital has its origins in the Chirk and District Cottage Hospital which was financed by local miners and opened in 1921. It joined the National Health Service in 1948 and became the Chirk and District Hospital in 1955. It was rebuilt on the same site and reopened as the Chirk Community Hospital in 1990.

References

NHS hospitals in Wales
Hospitals established in 1921
Hospital buildings completed in 1990
Hospitals in Wrexham County Borough
Chirk
Betsi Cadwaladr University Health Board